Sony Elá Nguema  is an Equatoguinean football club based in the city of Malabo. The club won 8 titles in a row, from 1984 to 1991.

Achievements
Equatoguinean Premier League: 16
1984, 1985, 1986, 1987, 1988, 1989, 1990, 1991, 1998, 2000, 2002, 2009, 2011, 2012, 2014, 2015–16.

Equatoguinean Cup: 7
1980, 1981, 1982, 1983, 1992, 1997, 2004.

Equatoguinean SuperCup: 1
2011.

Performance in CAF competitions
CAF Champions League: 5 appearances
1999 – First Round
2001 – First Round
2003 – Preliminary Round
2010 – Preliminary Round
2012 –

 African Cup of Champions Clubs: 3 appearances
1980 – First Round
1988 – Preliminary Round
1992 – Preliminary Round

CAF Confederation Cup: 2 appearances
2005 – First Round
2011 – Preliminary Round

CAF Cup: 1 appearance
2000 – Preliminary Round

CAF Cup Winners' Cup: 6 appearances

1982 – First Round
1983 – First Round

1986 – Preliminary Round
1987 – First Round

1993 – First Round
1998 – Preliminary Round

Notable players

References

Sport in Malabo
Football clubs in Equatorial Guinea